Selçuk Yöntem (born 13 July 1953) is a Turkish actor and TV presenter.

Life and career 
Yöntem was born on 13 July 1953 in Eyüpsultan, Istanbul. His mother was from Erzurum and his father was from Sakarya. In 1976, he graduated from Ankara State Conservatory with a degree in theatre studies. In 1977 started working in the same institution. In 1994, Yöntem took the play Aşağıdakiler on stage, followed by Gürültülü Patırtılı Bir Hikâye in 1995. Between 1997–1998, he directed an adaptation of Haldun Taner's play Ay Işığında Şamata. Aside from his career on stage, he joined TRT Istanbul Radio and took part in presenting radio plays.

He simultaneously continued a career in television and cinema, and for his performance in the movie C Blok, he was given the "Best Supporting Actor" award. After his portrayal of the Bozo character in Deli Yürek TV series and its follow-up movie, in 2003 he joined the cast of Kurtlar Vadisi as Aslan Akbey.

Another breakthrough came with his role in the 2008 drama series Aşk-ı Memnu as Adnan Ziyagil. He also presented about 400 episodes of Büyük Risk on Star TV and then on Show TV. In 2013, he was cast in ATV's series Bugünün Saraylısı, playing the role of Ata Katipoğlu.

He also took the task of presenting the popular game show Kim Milyoner Olmak İster? in 2014, after the former presenter Kenan Işık suffered from a stroke.

Filmography

References

External links 
 
 

1953 births
Living people
People from Eyüp
Turkish male film actors
Turkish male television actors
Turkish male stage actors
Turkish television presenters